Taste of Heaven is the second studio album by hard rock band Takara released in May 1995 on Long Island Records.

Upon its release, the album was selling so well that Long Island Records brought the band to Germany for a promo tour. After one week in Germany they returned home to find that their new album had broken into the Billboard chart in Japan at number 96.

Track listing
 "When Darkness Falls"
 "Days of Dawn"
 "Your Love"
 "December"
 "Last Mistake"
 "Taste of Heaven"
 "Sacred Pleasure"
 "2 Late"
 "Save Me"
 "Lonely Shade of Blue"
 "Again Your Love Is Mine" (Acoustic)
 "Restless Heart" (Acoustic)

Personnel
Jeff Scott Soto – lead vocals, acoustic guitar, keyboards, percussion
Carl Demarco – bass
Neal Grusky – guitar
Robert Duda – drums
Bob Daisley – bass on tracks 3,4

External links
 [ Allmusic.com]
 Official Website

1995 albums
Takara (band) albums